Erebia polaris, the Arctic woodland ringlet, is a butterfly of the family Nymphalidae. It is found in Lapland and boreal Asia. The habitat consists of damp grasslands, but this butterfly also occurs on dry grasslands and in waste places, often where shelter is provided by birches or juniper bushes.

Description
Females tend to be a little larger than males. The upperside of both the forewings and hindwings are dark brown with black eyespots with red margins in a row near the edge. In the male the eyespots are small and do not usually have a white centre except possibly the front one. In the female they may be no bigger but many of them have white centres and they may be more numerous forming a continuous line. The underside of the wings is similar to the upperside. This butterfly can be distinguished from the rather similar Lapland ringlet (Erebia embla) and the Arran brown (Erebia ligea) by the fact that it has no white blotches on the under surfaces of the wings. It can be distinguished from the Arctic ringlet (Erebia disa) by the fact that it always has eyespots on its hindwings.

Distribution and habitat
It is typically found on sandy river banks, on damp grassland, at the edges of meadows that are prone to flooding and in drier places with shelter provided by trees and bushes.

Biology
These butterflies are on the wing in July. Females lay their eggs on grasses such as Festuca ovina, Milium effusum and Poa palustris, the larval host plants. The larvae take nearly two years to develop and are a light tan or pale green with longitudinal stripes including a medial dark stripe.

Status
The IUCN lists this species as being of "least concern" as it is not believed to be facing any major threats.

References

Erebia
Butterflies described in 1871
Insects of the Arctic
Butterflies of Europe
Butterflies of Asia
Taxa named by Otto Staudinger